The Royal Prussian State Gendarmerie was the gendarmerie of the Kingdom of Prussia from 1812 to 1918. Until the foundation of the Prussian security police in 1919, the corps was the largest police force in the empire after the gendarmeries of Bavaria and Saxony with 1918 over 5,500 gendarmes, albeit fewer in number than the Berlin Royal Protection Team  with around 7,000 officers and the Hamburg Protection Team with around 6,000 officers. In contrast to the Royal Saxon Land Gendarmerie, founded in 1810, which the Ministry of the Interior, the Prussian gendarmerie was militarily organized and part of the army . In the war against France in 1870/71 and in the First World War in 1914/18, it formed the core of the Feldgendarmerie. In 1920 it was converted into the Landjäger.

After the annexation of the Electorate of Hesse in 1866, the Land Gendarmerie Corps of the Electoral Hessian Army and the Royal Hanover Landdragon Corps were taken over into Prussian services when the Kingdom of Hanover was annexed.

See also 
Grand Duchy of Baden Gendarmerie Corps

Defunct gendarmeries
Military history of Prussia
1810s establishments in Prussia
1918 disestablishments in Prussia